Magnus Johansson may refer to:

 Magnus Johansson (handball coach) (born 1969), handball coach  
 Magnus Johansson (footballer, born 1964), football player for SK Brann, later coach
 Magnus Johansson (footballer, born 1971), football player for Ölme, IFK Göteborg and FC Groningen
 Magnus Johansson (ice hockey) (born 1973), professional ice hockey player who currently plays with SEL team Linköpings HC

See also 
 Magnus Johansen (1886–1970), Norwegian politician